The following highways are numbered 581:

United States